The Cannes Mandelieu Space Center is an industrial plant dedicated to spacecraft manufacturing, located in both the towns of Cannes and Mandelieu in France. After a long history in aircraft manufacturing, starting in 1929, the center became increasingly involved in aerospace activities after the Second World War, and satellites are now the plant's main product.

After having been the Satellite Division of Aérospatiale, then Alcatel Space in 1998, then Alcatel Alenia Space in 2005, the center is now part, since April 10, 2007, of Thales Alenia Space and the headquarters of the company.

Main products

As prime contractor 
 the series of Meteosat first and second generation
 the series of communication satellites Spacebus
 the series of Globalstar's second-generation satellites
 the series of O3b satellites
 the Infrared Space Observatory
 the Huygens space probe, which landed on Titan
 the Proteus series of small low earth orbit satellites, including
 the COROT satellite
 Jason-1, Jason-2 and Jason-3
 the CALIPSO satellite
 the Planck spacecraft
 the Herschel Space Observatory
 ISS modules Node 2, Node 3, Cupola, and the MPLM

As the main subcontractor 
 the cameras for the French military observation satellites Helios-1 and Helios-2
 the IASI, Infrared Atmospheric Sounding Interferometer, embarked on-board Metop
 the MERIS camera embarked on board the ENVISAT mission.

See also 
 French space program

References

External links
  See CASPWiki

Spacecraft manufacturers
Privately held companies of France
Space program of France